Bantu may refer to:

Bantu languages, constitute the largest sub-branch of the Niger–Congo languages
Bantu peoples, over 400 peoples of Africa speaking a Bantu language
Bantu knots, a type of African hairstyle
Black Association for Nationalism Through Unity, a youth activism group in the 1960s
Bantu (band), a band based in Lagos, Nigeria
Bantu (album), a 2005 album by Bantu
Bantu FC, an association football club in Mafeteng, Lesotho

See also
Bantu expansion, a series of migrations of Bantu speakers 
Bantustan, designated land set aside for black Africans in South Africa during apartheid

Language and nationality disambiguation pages